John F. Amodeo (born August 1, 1950) is an American Republican politician, who served in the New Jersey General Assembly from January 8, 2008, until January 14, 2014, where he represented the 2nd Legislative District.

Amodeo serves in the Assembly on the Agriculture and Natural Resources Committee and the Transportation, Public Works and Independent Authorities Committee.

Amodeo served on the Linwood City Council from 1998–2005, and on the city's Planning Board from 2004 to 2005. He is a crane operator with International Union of Operating Engineers Local 825.

Early life and education
Born in Camden, New Jersey, Amodeo was raised in Margate City and attended St. Augustine Preparatory School.

Amodeo received a B.A. from Mount Saint Mary College with a major in History and Political Science.

District 2 
Each of the forty districts in the New Jersey Legislature has one representative in the New Jersey Senate and two members in the New Jersey General Assembly. The other representatives from the 2nd District for the 2012-2013 Legislative Session were:
 Senator Jim Whelan, and
 Assemblyman Chris A. Brown

In the 2013 elections, Amodeo and Brown faced a challenge from Northfield Mayor Vince Mazzeo and Longport Mayor Nick Russo with Mazzeo declared the winner for the second seat, 32 votes ahead of Amodeo. Amodeo filed for a recount after Mazzeo had been declared the winner by a margin of 38 votes among the more than 100,000 ballots cast and conceded to Mazzeo shortly after a month-long process showed Mazzeo ahead by 51 votes.

References

External links
Assemblyman Amodeo's legislative web page, New Jersey Legislature
New Jersey Legislature financial disclosure forms
2012 2011 2010 2009 2008 2007

New Jersey city council members
Crane operators
American builders
1950 births
Living people
Mount Saint Mary College alumni
Republican Party members of the New Jersey General Assembly
People from Linwood, New Jersey
People from Margate City, New Jersey
Politicians from Camden, New Jersey
St. Augustine Preparatory School alumni
21st-century American politicians